The Ontario Central Railroad  is an American class III railroad company operating in Ontario County, New York. As of 2007, the ONCT has been under the ownership of the Finger Lakes Railway which is based in Geneva, New York.

The ONCT was formed from an approximate 13 mile section of the Lehigh Valley mainline from Shortsville, New York to Victor, New York as well as a short section of the New York Central's Auburn Road in Victor. 
This trackage was saved by the actions of the communities it serves. The plan for forming Conrail involved the abandonment of all the trackage that became the ONCT; but several rail customers wanted to keep rail service. With the building of a short connection from the LV to NYC trackage in Victor and an interchange in Shortsville, the ONCT began operating the rail lines in 1979; before which Conrail was obligated to do so as the designated operator.

Throughout the years, the ONCT has had a number of customers; but Victor Insulators, Inc. has been there from the beginning and was still receiving service as of 2019. This particular section in the Victor area may eventually be removed, though, per recent meetings between the Village of Victor, Town of Victor, Ontario County and Finger Lakes Railway. Other customers include, or have been, Ryan Homes, Iron City Sash & Door and others. The sole interchange for the ONCT has been in Shortsville, where Conrail constructed an interchange with the former Auburn Road of the NYC.

From the beginning the ONCT was a member of the "Ontario Lines" family of shorts lines in New York State until 1993. Other members included the Ontario Midland Railroad and the Ontario Eastern Railroad. In 1998, the Livonia, Avon and Lakeville Railroad bought a controlling interest in the ONCT. Then, in October 2007, the LAL sold the ONCT to the Finger Lakes Railway.

Locomotive roster
Below is a list of locomotives that were operated by the Ontario Central Railroad, all Alco.

 #14 was an Alco S-2 built in 1947, formerly Buffalo Creek (BCK) #46. It was transferred to Ontario Central (ONCT) by RSA Leasing (a lineside community based in Syracuse, New York) after being leased to the New York & Lake Erie Railroad. The locomotive was renumbered Engine #14.
 #86 (later #418) was an Alco RS-36 built in 1962, formerly Norfolk & Western (N&W) #2865. It was originally owned by the New York, Chicago & St.Louis (Nickel Plate Road (NKP)) as Engine #865.

Note: Some locomotives of the Ontario Lines may have been operated by other affiliates for a short period of time. What is generally listed are the primary operators during their ownerships.

Ontario Lines Affiliated Companies
 Ontario Midland Railroad (OMID)
 Ontario Central Railroad (ONCT)
 Ontario Eastern Railroad (ONER)
 Jersey Southern Railway (JSRW)
 Allegheny Southern Railway (ASRW)
 Rail Services Associates, Inc. (later Rail Management Services, Inc.)

References

External links 

 Rochester-Railfan.net

New York (state) railroads
Spin-offs of Conrail